V. Suresh Thampanoor, commonly known as Aristo Suresh is a singer, film actor, and lyricist, who works in Malayalam cinema. He was a finalist of the first season of Bigg Boss Malayalam.

Personal life
Suresh hails from Aristo, a junction in Thampanoor, Thiruvananthapuram, Kerala. His family consists of father, mother and five sisters. For leisure he writes poems and folk songs and is popular for his knack for rhythm.

Acting career
Suresh made his acting debut in the 2016 Malayalam film Action Hero Biju directed by Abrid Shine. He sang the popular song ‘Muthe Ponne Pinangallee’ in his debut film which became popular on social media platforms for its fun yet simple rhythm and beat, song being entirely composed and written by him. After the song and the movie both blew up, he gained popularity. In 2018, he joined the controversial TV show Bigg Boss Malayalam as one of the contestants., he acted the role of Pillai achan in Avarodoppam Aliyum Achayanum (Onam Special TV series on Asianet), has also done a role in Pathalam Dairies telecasted on Surya TV and also acted in TV series Ennum Sammatham on Mazhavil Manorama and Koodevide in Asianet. He has also acted in web series Kanimagalam Kovilakam and prakashante pennukanal.

Filmography

 2016: Action Hero Biju
 2017: Sakhavu
 2017: Udaharanam Sujatha
 2018: Poomaram
 2018: Kuttanadan Marpappa
 2018: Parole
 2018: Cuban Colony
 2019: Ittymaani: Made in China
 2019: Kolaambi
 2019: Moonam Pralayam
 2019: Prathi Poovankozhi

References

External links
 

Living people
Male actors from Thiruvananthapuram
Male actors in Malayalam cinema
Indian male film actors
Malayalam playback singers
Malayalam-language lyricists
Indian male playback singers
21st-century Indian male actors
1969 births
Bigg Boss Malayalam contestants